Fall Weiss (German orthography Fall Weiß translated as Case White following the German military's naming convention)  may refer to two military operations:

 Fall Weiss (1939), the German invasion of Poland
 Case White (1943), an Axis operation against the Yugoslav Partisans throughout occupied Yugoslavia, ending in the Battle of the Neretva

ja:白作戦